The 2017 Supercopa MX was a Mexican football match-up played on 16 July 2017 between the champions of the Apertura 2016 Copa MX, Querétaro, and América. Like the previous two editions, the 2017 Supercopa MX was contested in a single-leg format at a neutral venue in the United States. This match took place at the StubHub Center in Carson, California for the second straight year. 

The match is normally contested by the winners of the Apertura and Clausura editions of the Copa MX. However Guadalajara, winners of the Clausura 2017, also won the Clausura 2017 Liga MX, and thus qualified for the 2017 Campeón de Campeones. Since Guadalajara were also the Supercopa MX title holders, they were replaced by América, who were the team that accumulated the most aggregate points in the previous two editions of Copa MX that was not already playing in either the Campeón de Campeones or Supercopa MX.

The 2017 Supercopa MX was part of a doubleheader, which also includes the 2017 Campeón de Campeones, organized by Univision Deportes, Soccer United Marketing (SUM), Liga MX and LA Galaxy.

Match details

See also
Apertura 2016 Copa MX
Clausura 2017 Copa MX

References

2017
2017–18 in Mexican football